"Generals" is a single by English punk rock band the Damned, released in November 1982 by Bronze Records.

Like its parent album, it featured increased experimentation, with a piano-led sound and the addition of brass to the band's typical punk rock blend. The song followed the thoughtful material on the album, commenting on the true losers in war.

The song was the band's last release on Bronze, who would drop the band when they hit financial difficulties. For their part, the Damned were never happy with the marketing they received, believing the label had no idea how to promote them. It would also be their last release with bassist Paul Gray, who would leave the band on the eve of their 1983 tour.

Track listing
 "Generals" (Scabies, Sensible, Vanian, Gray) - 3:24
 "Disguise" (Scabies, Sensible, Vanian, Gray, Jugg) - 3:27
 "Citadel Zombies" (Scabies, Sensible, Vanian, Gray, Jugg)

Production credits
 Producers:
 The Damned
 Musicians:
 Dave Vanian − vocals
 Captain Sensible − guitar
 Rat Scabies − drums
 Paul Gray − bass
 Guest Musicians
 Simon Lloyd − brass on "Generals"
 Roman Jugg − keyboard

1982 singles
The Damned (band) songs
Songs written by Rat Scabies
Songs written by Captain Sensible
Songs written by David Vanian
Songs written by Paul Gray (English musician)
1982 songs
Bronze Records singles